Archeological Museum of Manisa is an archeological museum within the Manisa Museum, situated in the historic kulliye of  Muradiye Mosque. Local and regional artefacts from antique Magnesia, Sardes and other regional towns are displayed. The museum displays cover a wide range of eras from prehistory to the 20th century. Ethnography Museum is in the nearby building. The museum was opened on October 29, 1937.

References

1937 establishments in Turkey
Manisa
Manisa
Museums established in 1937
Museums in Manisa Province